Jeanie Deans is the heroine of the novel the Heart of Midlothian.

Jeanie Deans may also refer to:
 PS Jeanie Deans, a ship
 Jeanie Deans (railway locomotives)
 Jeanie Deans (opera), an opera by Hamish MacCunn
 Jeanie Deans (play), a play by Dion Boucicault
 "Jeanie Deans" (song)
 "Jeanie Deans" (poem), a poem by Carolina Oliphant (Lady Nairne)
 Jeanie Deans (hybrid rose)
 Jeanie Deans (geriatric unit), a hospital unit in Victoria Infirmary, Helensburgh, Scotland